Hintersee  is a municipality in the Vorpommern-Greifswald district, in Mecklenburg-Vorpommern, Germany. It is located near the border with Poland.

References

Vorpommern-Greifswald

fr:Hintersee